(Joseph) Vincent McDermott (September 5, 1933 – February 10, 2016) was a classically trained American composer and ethnomusicologist. His works show particular influence from the musics of South and Southeast Asia, particularly the gamelan music of Java. He was among the second generation of American composers to create and promote new compositions for gamelan.

Education
McDermott was born in Atlantic City, New Jersey. He received a B.F.A. in music composition from the University of Pennsylvania (1959), an M.A. in music history from the University of California, Berkeley (1961), and a Ph.D. in music history, theory, and composition from the University of Pennsylvania (1966). His composition instructors included Constant Vauclain, George Rochberg, Darius Milhaud, and Karlheinz Stockhausen. In 1980, McDermott became friends with Lou Harrison, the godfather of American gamelan. It was Harrison who encouraged McDermott to start composing for gamelan.

McDermott first encountered gamelan circa 1965 in Amsterdam. He later studied Javanese gamelan in Indonesia at the Akademi Seni Karawitan Indonesia (now Sekolah Tinggi Seni Indonesia Surakarta) in Central Java (1971, 1978, and 1984). He studied or worked in Surakarta with Sumarsam and Rahayu Supanggah, and later, in the United States, with Pak Cokro and Midiyanto. In the 1970s he made an intensive study of Hindustani classical music, studying with sitarist Ira Das Gupta, and with renowned tabla player Zakir Hussain.

He died in Sumatra, Indonesia, on February 10, 2016.

Compositions
Many of McDermott's works are for standard Western ensembles (e.g. chamber, orchestral, choral, solo, and electronic). In 1969 he began to incorporate sounds and ideas from North Indian music. In 1980 Lou Harrison encouraged McDermott to begin composing for gamelan. He then composed a number of works for gamelan (some in combination with Western instruments), and presented gamelan workshops in several Asian nations (including Malaysia and Japan), focusing primarily on encouraging new compositions for gamelan. He received several Fulbright grants and National Endowment for the Arts commissions and a "Master's Award" from the Oregon Arts Commission.

McDermott's compositions have been performed in North America, Europe, and Asia. From the earliest period he was drawn to cross-cultural works, multimedia, and theatrical music. Two of his operas, The King of Bali and Mata Hari, juxtapose gamelan and Western ensembles. Both were written and performed in the U.S. with English texts in the 1990s, and in this century were translated into Indonesian and performed in Yogyakarta, Indonesia.

McDermott's musical style varied. His generation witnessed the onset of a wealth of new styles, and in his early days he tried his hand at many of them. By and by he eschewed the poles of abstract atonality and indeterminacy that were much in favor in the 1960s and 1970s, turning instead to modality, melody, and counterpoint. His compositional goals are expressivity, depth, and spirituality, yet often with a light heart. In Asia, he advised young composers to borrow from Western traditions, saying it will help them speak to international audiences, but he insisted that the soul of their music as well as many of its techniques must come from their own soil.

Teaching
McDermott taught at the Hampton Institute (now Hampton University) in Virginia (1966–67) and at the Wisconsin Conservatory of Music in Milwaukee where he served for a time as dean and director (1967–1977). In 1977 he began teaching at Lewis & Clark College in Oregon; he retired in December 1997. While there he began the college's world music program and in 1980 founded its first gamelan, Venerable Showers of Beauty, which was purchased in Java with the help of Rahayu Supanggah and Nyonya Nora along with an American patron, Loraine Fenwick. He directed the gamelan and later invited Javanese musicians to teach (including Midiyanto, Supardi, and Darsono). He also instituted classes in Indian and African music performance with Nisha Joshi and Obo Addy. He later helped to establish gamelan programs at the College of William & Mary and the University of Puget Sound. Among his composition students at Lewis & Clark College were Greg Bowers, Erika Foin, Hoe Yeong KIm, Duncan Nielson, Myrna Schloss, and Sophia Serghi.

After retirement, McDermott was a Visiting Professor at The College of William and Mary (2002); Indonesian Institute of the Arts (2002–03); University of Malaya, Kuala Lumpur (2006); Osaka City University (2005); and University of Technology (MARA), Shah Alam, Malaysia (2009). The last four placements were assisted by Fulbright programs.

During his last years, McDermott divided his time between the United States and Yogyakarta, Indonesia. In Yogyakarta, he directed an ensemble called Musica Teatrica Nova.

Selected works
1967 – Five Bagatelles, piano
1970 – Three for Five, flute, sax, tabla, vibes, piano
1972 – Komal Usha-Rudra Nisha, sitar, flute, guitar, and double bass
1972 – He Who ascends by Ecstasy into Contemplation of Sublime Things Sleeps and Sees a Dream, piano and tape
1973 – Time Let Me Plan and Be Golden in the Mercy of His Means, guitar and harpsichord
1975 – Magic Grounds, piano
1975 – Orpheus, tape and video
1975 – Pictures at an Exhibition, tape and slide projections
1976 – Siftings Upon Siftings, orchestra
1977 – Slayer of Time, Ancient of Days, (cantata), voices, E. horn, harp, cello, percussion, texts from Bhagavad-Gita and Rabindranath Tagore
1978 – Rain of Hollow Reeds, tape
1978 – Smoke of Burning Cloves, solo instrument
1978 – A Perpetual Dream, opera for solo voice, tape, dancers/mimes, bonang, and toy piano
1979 – Solonese Concerto, piano and chamber orchestra
1980 – A Stately Salute, in honor of Lou Harrison, pelog gamelan
1980 – Laudamus, chorus
1981 – Kagoklaras (A Different Song), gamelan and prepared piano
1981 – Tagore Songs, soprano and guitar
1982 – Sweet-Breathed Minstrel I, a mystic poem of Rumi, slendro gamelan, two solo voices, and viola
1983 – The Dark Laments of Ariadne and of attis, 2 songs after Catullus, soprano, narrator, viola, tape
1984 – The Bells of Tajilor, gamelan slendro/pelog
1986 – Fiddles, Queens, and Laddies, soprano, tape, and drums on texts by Laurence Sterne and Robert Burns
1990 – The King of Bali (opera), gamelan and orchestra
1991 – Fugitive Moons, string quartet
1994 – Mata Hari (opera), chamber music group and gamelan
1994 – Titus Magnificus, orchestra
1997 – Sweet-Breathed Minstrel II, pelog gamelan, two solo voices, and male chorus (3–4 voices), text by Jalal ad-Din Muhammad Rumi
1999 – Quartet for trumpet, sax, piano, percussion
2002 – The Spirit Takes Wings and Soars (or Dragons in the Grachten), 12-tone gamelan and saxophone quartet
2003 – Divine Songs for voice and gender/vibraphone
2005 – A Little Concerto, gamelan slendro/pelog
2005 – The Blue Forest, gamelan, chorus, dancers, and shadow puppetry
2006 – Cahaya Jiwa (Light of the Soul), solo voice and instrument
2008 – "Mimpi Solo (Solonese Dreams)", gamelan

Published writings
McDermott, Vincent (1966). "The Articulation of Musical Space in the 20th Century." Ph.D. dissertation. University of Pennsylvania.
—. "A Conceptual Musical Space." Journal of Aesthetics and Art Criticism, v. 30, no. 4 (Summer 1972), pp. 489–494.
—, with Sumarsam. "Central Javanese Music: The Patet of Laras Slendro and the Gender Barung." Ethnomusicology 19:2 (1975).
—. "Gamelans and New Music." The Musical Quarterly, v. 72, no. 1 (1986), pp. 16–27.
—. Imagi-Nation: Membuat Musik Biasa Jadi Luar Biasa (in Indonesian). Art Music Today, Yogyakarta, Indonesia, 2013. 94 pp. Introduction by Rahayu Supanggah. [English translation of title: (A new) National Imagination. Making Ordinary Music Extraordinary]

References

External links
"Vincent McDermott Memorial Concert, March 17, 2018", Lewis & Clark College

1933 births
Musicians from Atlantic City, New Jersey
2016 deaths
University of California, Berkeley alumni
University of Pennsylvania alumni
20th-century classical composers
21st-century classical composers
American male classical composers
American classical composers
American ethnomusicologists
Gamelan musicians
Tabla players
People from Yogyakarta
Lewis & Clark College faculty
Pupils of K. P. H. Notoprojo
Pupils of Darius Milhaud
Pupils of Karlheinz Stockhausen
21st-century American composers
20th-century American composers
20th-century American drummers
American male drummers
21st-century American drummers